Console Connect by PCCW Global is an easy-to-use platform for the Software-Defined Interconnection® of businesses, applications and infrastructure. It allows users to self-provision private, high-performance connections between a global ecosystem of enterprise, carrier, cloud, SaaS, IoT, UCaaS, IX and other Network-as-a-Service partners.

Console Connect is underpinned by one of the world’s largest private MPLS networks and a Tier 1 global IP network that is ranked in the top 10 for IPv4 and IPv6 peering, which delivers higher levels of network performance, speed and security.

Console Connect has won multiple industry awards, including the Global Carrier Award for Wholesale Innovation Disruptor (2020) and Best Network Technology Innovation (2019), the Telecom Review Award for Most Innovative Product or Service (Operator) (2020), and the Juniper Research Award for Network Virtualization Innovation of the Year (2021).

History 
Console Connect Inc was a venture-backed startup, and claims to have raised $65 Million in venture capital as of the end of 2015.

Founded as IIX Corp., in May 2016, IIX changed its name to Console Connect Inc. It went by both Console and IIX in various marketing and advertisements.

In October 2017, it sold its global network business to IX Reach (comprising all customers and global network and physical assets),  and its software intellectual property and development team were sold in November 2017 to PCCW Global.

Within 90 days of the acquisition, the Console Connect platform was able to automate layer 2 services on the PCCW Global network. It achieved this by introducing a Software-Defined Networking (SDN) overlay that fully automates all switching and routing across the PCCW Global network.

By October 2018, Console Connect had been integrated with all major IaaS providers, enabling users to self-provision direct connections to Amazon Web Services, Microsoft Azure, Google Cloud, IBM Cloud, Alibaba Cloud and Tencent Cloud.

In June 2019, Console Connect launched a PAYG model that allows users to self-provision virtual connections to the cloud or between data centres for a duration of their choice.

In February 2021, PCCW Global’s network achieved MEF 3.0 Carrier Ethernet (CE) Service certification for Global Ethernet over MPLS services for both the Console Connect platform and its Switched Ethernet Services. The company is the first to receive global certification at 10G; the highest possible level that can be attained by MEF standards.

As of March 2021, Console Connect is directly interconnected with more than 400 data centres in over 50 countries worldwide.

References

Technology companies of the United States